My Wishes (Pinyin: Xin Yuan) is a 1999 film directed by Lam Yee Hung. It also called as 為你瘋狂 (Pinyin: Wei Ni Feng Kuang)

Plot
This is a movie about celebrity, fandom, and "misplaced" devotion.

External links
My Wishes at Hong Kong Cinemagic

Hong Kong romance films
1999 films
1990s Cantonese-language films
1990s Mandarin-language films
1990s romance films
1990s Hong Kong films